Preservation Bay is a rural locality in the local government area (LGA) of Central Coast in the North-west and west LGA region of Tasmania. The 2016 census recorded a population of 74 for the state suburb of Preservation Bay.

History 
Preservation Bay is a confirmed locality. 

The locality was first settled by Europeans in 1852.

Geography
The waters of Preservation Bay, an inlet of Bass Strait, form the northern boundary. The Western Railway Line passes through from north-east to north-west.

Road infrastructure 
National Route 1 (Bass Highway) passes to the south. From there, Preservation Drive provides access to the locality.

References

Towns in Tasmania
Localities of Central Coast Council (Tasmania)